Avalanche is the first solo album by Canadian artist Matthew Good. Released in 2003, the album marked a creative departure from his earlier work with the Matthew Good Band, and featured accompaniment by the Vancouver Symphony Orchestra on several tracks.

The album had three singles: "Weapon", "In a World Called Catastrophe" and "Near Fantastica", although "Near Fantastica" was released only to radio in a substantially shorter edit. The music video for "Weapon" won a Juno Award, which was shared between Good and co-director Ante Kovac (Good refused to accept the award, however, as he boycotts the Juno Awards).

Producer Warne Livesey, who previously worked with Good on the massively successful Beautiful Midnight, received a Juno Award nomination for his work on Avalanche.

Reception and commercial performance
The album received high praise from both music critics and fans of Good alike. The album debuted at No. 2 on the Canadian Albums Chart, selling 16,800 copies in its first week. The album was certified Gold on May 8, 2003.

Track listing

Composition
"Near Fantastica" is perhaps the oldest song from Avalanche. Written in 1996, "Near Fantastica" was originally stated by Good to have been musically similar to "Suburbia" (from Beautiful Midnight) and vocally similar to "Every Name Is My Name" (from Last of the Ghetto Astronauts) On Avalanche the lyrics were altered slightly from those Good posted online in 1999. The music, too, was changed to incorporate aspects of another song "Villain of the Year", which Good had become disenchanted with during the recording of Avalanche. The original version, which is a mere 4:23, was dubbed the 'radio edit' of the song and released as the record's third single. The 8-minute version on the album was altered from the original version during the mixing of Avalanche as he preferred it to the "simple verse, chorus, structure of the original."
"A Long Way Down" was one of the last songs written for Avalanche. The song is based around a drum track that was taken from another song, "Comfortable Criminals", which was later cut from the album and released as a b-side.

Personnel
Matthew Good                           –  vocals, guitar, art direction
Christian Thor Valdson                     –  guitar
Pat Steward                            –  drums, percussion
Rich Priske                            –  bass guitar

References

2003 debut albums
Matthew Good albums
Universal Music Canada albums
Albums produced by Warne Livesey